Jane Alexander (born 1939) is an American actress, author, and former director of the National Endowment for the Arts.

Jane Alexander may also refer to:

 Jane Alexander (bishop) (born 1959), bishop of the Anglican Church of Canada
 Jane Alexander (1922–2008), American activist; she founded the group Citizens Against Homicide and inspired the book Citizen Jane
 Jane Alexander (artist)  (born 1959), South African artist
 Jane Alexander (British actress) (born 1972), British actress
 Jane Alexander (swimmer) (born 1958), British swimmer
 Jane Alexander (author) (born 1974), Scottish novelist and short story writer
 Jane Alexander (politician) (1929–2020), American lawyer, politician, and businesswoman